The English philologist and author J. R. R. Tolkien created several constructed languages, mostly for his fictional world of Middle-earth. Inventing languages, something that he called glossopoeia (paralleling his idea of mythopoeia or myth-making), was a lifelong occupation for Tolkien, starting in his teens. An early project was the reconstruction of an unrecorded early Germanic language which might have been spoken by the people of Beowulf in the Germanic Heroic Age.

The most developed of his glossopoeic projects was his family of Elvish languages. He first started constructing an Elvin tongue in  while he was at King Edward's School, Birmingham. He later called it Quenya, and he continued actively developing the history and grammar of his Elvish languages until his death in 1973.

In 1931, he held a lecture about his passion for constructed languages, titled A Secret Vice. Here he contrasts his project of artistic languages constructed for aesthetic pleasure with the pragmatism of international auxiliary languages. The lecture also discusses Tolkien's views on phonaesthetics, citing Greek, Finnish, and Welsh as examples of "languages which have a very characteristic and in their different ways beautiful word-form".

Tolkien's glossopoeia has two temporal dimensions: the internal (fictional) timeline of events in Middle-earth described in The Silmarillion and other writings, and the external timeline of Tolkien's own life during which he often revised and refined his languages and their fictional history.

Inspiration and background

Tolkien was a professional philologist of ancient Germanic languages, specialising in Old English. He was also interested in many languages outside his field, and developed a particular love for the Finnish language. He described the finding of a Finnish grammar book as "like discovering a complete wine-cellar filled with bottles of an amazing wine of a kind and flavour never tasted before".

Glossopoeia was Tolkien's hobby for most of his life. At a little over 13, he helped construct a sound substitution cypher known as Nevbosh, 'new nonsense', which grew to include some elements of actual invented language. Notably, Tolkien claimed that this was not his first effort in invented languages. Shortly thereafter, he developed a true invented language called Naffarin which contained elements that would survive into his later languages, which he continued to work on until his death more than 65 years later. Language invention had always been tightly connected to the mythology that Tolkien developed, as he found that a language could not be complete without the history of the people who spoke it, just as these people could never be fully realistic if imagined only through English and as speaking English. Tolkien therefore took the stance of a translator and adaptor rather than that of the original author of his works.

Language and mythology

Tolkien was of the opinion that the invention of an artistic language in order to be convincing and pleasing must include not only the language's historical development, but also the history of its speakers, and especially the mythology associated with both the language and the speakers. It was this idea that an "Elvish language" must be associated with a complex history and mythology of the Elves that was at the core of the development of Tolkien's legendarium.

Tolkien wrote in one of his letters:

While the Elvish languages remained at the center of Tolkien's attention, the requirements of the narratives associated with Middle-earth also necessitated the development at least superficially of the languages of other races, especially of Dwarves and Men, but also the Black Speech designed by Sauron, the main antagonist in The Lord of the Rings. This latter language was designed to be the ostensible antithesis of the ideal of an artistic language pursued with the development of Quenya, the Black Speech representing a dystopian parody of an international auxiliary language just as Sauron's rule over the Orcs is a dystopian parody of a totalitarian state.

Elvish languages

Lhammas and Valarin 

Tolkien had worked out much of the etymological background of his Elvish languages during the 1930s (collected in the form of The Etymologies). 
In 1937, he wrote the Lhammas, a linguistic treatise addressing the relationship of not just the Elvish languages, but of all languages spoken in Middle-earth during the First Age. 
The text purports to be a translation of an Elvish work, written by one Pengolodh, whose historical works are presented as being the main source of the narratives in The Silmarillion concerning the First Age.

The Lhammas  exists in two versions, the shorter one being called the Lammasathen. The main linguistic thesis in this text is that the languages of Middle-earth are all descended from the language of the Valar (the "gods"), Valarin, and divided into three branches:

 Oromëan, named after Oromë, who taught the first Elves to speak. All languages of Elves and most languages of Men are Oromëan.
 Aulëan, named after Aulë, maker of the Dwarves, is the origin of the Khuzdul language. It has had some influences on the tongues of Men.
 Melkian, named after the rebellious Melkor or Morgoth, is the origin in the First Age of the many tongues used by the Orcs and other evil beings. (This tongue is unrelated to the Black Speech of Sauron.)

Tolkien later revised this internal history to the effect that the Elves had been capable of inventing language on their own, before coming into contact with Valarin.

Language family 

The Elvish language family is a group of languages related by descent from a common ancestor, called the proto-language. Tolkien constructed the family from around 1910, working on it up to his death in 1973. He constructed the grammar and vocabulary of at least fifteen languages and dialects in roughly three periods:

 Early, 1910 – : most of the proto-language Primitive Quendian, Common Eldarin, Quenya, and Goldogrin.
 Mid: : Goldogrin changed into Noldorin, joined by Telerin, Ilkorin, Doriathrin and Avarin.
 Late: Ilkorin and Doriathrin disappeared; Noldorin matured into Sindarin.

Although the Elvish languages Sindarin and Quenya are the most famous and the most developed of the languages that Tolkien invented for his Secondary World, they are by no means the only ones. They belong to a family of Elvish languages, that originate in Common Eldarin, the language common to all Eldar, which in turn originates in Primitive Quendian, the common root of Eldarin and Avarin languages.

Finnish morphology (particularly its rich system of inflection) in part gave rise to Quenya. Another of Tolkien's favourites was Welsh, and features of Welsh phonology found their way into Sindarin. Very few words were borrowed from existing languages so that attempts to match a source to a particular Elvish word or name in works published during his lifetime are often very dubious.

The Lord of the Rings

When working on The Lord of the Rings during the 1940s, Tolkien invested great effort into detailing the linguistics of Middle-earth.

Mannish languages

Adûnaic 

Tolkien devised Adûnaic (or Númenórean), the language spoken in Númenor, shortly after World War II, and thus at about the time he completed The Lord of the Rings, but before he wrote the linguistic background of the Appendices. Adûnaic is intended as the language from which Westron (also called Adûni) is derived. This added a depth of historical development to the Mannish languages. Adûnaic was intended to have a "faintly Semitic flavour". Its development began with The Notion Club Papers (written in 1945). It is there that the most extensive sample of the language is found, revealed to one of the (modern-day) protagonists, Lowdham, of that story in a visionary dream of Atlantis. Its grammar is sketched in the unfinished "Lowdham's Report on the Adunaic Language".
 
Tolkien remained undecided whether the language of the Men of Númenor should be derived from the original Mannish language (as in Adûnaic), or if it should be derived from  "the Elvish Noldorin" (i.e. Quenya) instead. In The Lost Road and Other Writings, it is implied that the Númenóreans spoke Quenya, and that Sauron, hating all things Elvish, taught the Númenóreans the old Mannish tongue they themselves had forgotten.

Linguistic mapping 

When writing The Lord of the Rings, a sequel to The Hobbit, Tolkien came up with the literary device of using real languages to "translate" fictional languages. He pretended to have translated the original Sôval Phârë speech (Westron or the Common Speech) into English. This device of rendering an imaginary language with a real one was carried further by rendering:

 Rohirric, the language of Rohan (related to Sôval Phâre) by the Mercian dialect of Old English
 names in the tongue of Dale by Old Norse forms
 names of the Kingdom of Rhovanion by Gothic forms, thus mapping the genetic relation of his fictional languages on to the existing historical relations of the Germanic languages.

Furthermore, to parallel the Celtic substratum in England, he used Old Welsh names to render the Dunlendish names of Buckland Hobbits (e.g., Meriadoc for Kalimac).

Because of the device of having Modern English representing Westron, there was no necessity to actually work out the details of Westron grammar or vocabulary in any detail, but Tolkien does give some examples of Westron words in Appendix F to The Lord of the Rings, where he also summarizes its origin and role as lingua franca in Middle-earth:

Even orcs had to rely on using Common Speech (albeit in a much-debased form) for communication between themselves, because different orc sub-dialects were not mutually intelligible from one clan to the next.

Rohirric 

Rohirric is always represented by the Mercian dialect of Old English because Tolkien chose to make the relationship between Rohirric and the Common Speech similar to that of Old English and Modern English. The terms Rohirric, Rohirian, and Rohanese have all been used to refer to the language. Tolkien himself used "Rohanese". He only gave a few actual Rohirric words:

Kûd-dûkan, an old word meaning "hole-dweller", which evolved to kuduk, the name the Hobbits had for themselves
Lô- / loh- corresponding to Anglo-Saxon éoh, "war-horse", and the derived names Lôgrad for "Horse-Mark", and Lohtûr for Éothéod, "horse-people". This word is an exact homonym of the Hungarian word for "horse", ló. The Rohirric word for "horse" has been identified as a cognate for Tolkien's Elvish words for "horse": rocco (Quenya) and roch (Sindarin). All names beginning with Éo- supposedly represent Rohirric names beginning with Lô- or Loh-, but the Rohirric forms of names such as Éomer and Éowyn are not given.

Only one proper name is given, Tûrac, an old word for King, the Rohirric for Théoden, which is the Old English word þéoden, meaning "leader of a people", "King" or "prince". As with other descriptive names in his legendarium, Tolkien uses this name to create the impression that the text is "'historical', 'real' or 'archaic'".

Other languages 

Other Mannish languages envisaged for the setting of The Lord of the Rings, but barely developed in terms of grammar or vocabulary, include Haladin, Dunlendish, Drûg, Haradrim, and Easterling.

Dwarvish 

Some samples of Khuzdul, the language of the Dwarves, are given in The Lord of the Rings. The explanation here is a little different from the "Mannish" languages: as Khuzdul was supposedly kept secret by the Dwarves and never used in the presence of outsiders (not even Dwarvish given names), it was not "translated" by any real-life historical language, and such limited examples as there are in the text are given in the "original". 
Khuzdul was designed to have a "Semitic" affinity, with a system of triconsonantal roots and other parallels especially to Hebrew, just as some resemblances between the Dwarves and the Jews are intentional.

Entish 

The language of the Ents is also described in the novel. As the Ents were first taught to speak by Elves, Entish appears related to the Elvish languages. However, the Ents continued to develop their language. It is described as long and sonorous, a tonal language somewhat like a woodwind instrument. Only the Ents spoke Entish as no others could master it. Even the Elves, master linguists, could not learn Entish, nor did they attempt to record it because of its complex sound structure:

To illustrate these properties, Tolkien provides a-lalla-lalla-rumba-kamanda-lindor-burúme, the word for hill, as a purportedly inaccurate sampling of the language.

The grammatical structure of Old Entish was bizarre, often described as a lengthy, long-winded discussion of a topic. There may not even have been words for yes and no: such questions would be answered by a long monologue on why the Ent in question did or did not agree with the Ent who asked the question. The Ent Quickbeam was regarded as a very "hasty" Ent for answering a question before another Ent had finished: the end may only have been another hour away. Ents as a rule would say nothing in Entish unless it was worth taking a long time to say.

Black Speech 

Tolkien devised little of the Black Speech beyond the Rhyme of the Rings. He intentionally made it sound harsh but with a proper grammar. He stated that it was an agglutinative language; it has been likened to the extinct Hurrian language of northern Mesopotamia. 

In the fiction, it was created by the Dark Lord Sauron to be the official language of all the lands and peoples under his control. In practice it was never accepted willingly, and mutated into many mutually unintelligible Orkish dialects, so that Orcs communicated with each other mainly in a debased Westron.

Scripts 

Being a skilled calligrapher, Tolkien not only invented many languages but also scripts. Some of his scripts were designed for use with his constructed languages, others for more practical ends: to be used in his personal diary, and one especially for English, the New English Alphabet.

Tolkien's scripts were the Tengwar of Rúmil or Sarati; the Gondolinic Runes; the Valmaric script; Andyoqenya; Qenyatic; the New English Alphabet; the "Goblin alphabet" (in The Father Christmas Letters); the Tengwar of Fëanor; and the Cirth of Daeron.

Reception and study 

The first published monograph dedicated to the Elvish languages was An Introduction to Elvish (1978) edited by Jim Allan (published by Bran's Head Books). It is composed of articles written before the publication of The Silmarillion. Ruth Noel wrote a book on Middle-earth's languages in 1980.

With the publication of much linguistic material during the 1990s, especially in the History of Middle-earth series, 
and the Vinyar Tengwar and Parma Eldalamberon material published at an increasing rate during the early 2000s from the stock of linguistic material in the possession of the appointed team of editors (some 3000 pages according to them),
the subject of Tolkien's constructed languages has become much more accessible.

David Salo's 2007 A Gateway to Sindarin presents Sindarin's grammar concisely. Elizabeth Solopova's 2009 Languages, Myth and History gives an overview of the linguistic traits of the various languages invented by Tolkien and the history of their creation.

A few fanzines were dedicated to the subject, like Tyalië Tyelelliéva published by Lisa Star, and Quettar, the Bulletin of the Linguistic Fellowship of The Tolkien Society, published by Julian C. Bradfield. Tengwestië is an online publication of the Elvish Linguistic Fellowship.

Internet mailing lists and forums that have been dedicated to Tolkien's constructed languages include Tolklang, Elfling and Lambengolmor.

Since 2005, there has been an International Conference on J.R.R. Tolkien's Invented Languages, part of a series of biennial conferences at changing locations. They are open to everyone with a serious interest in Tolkien's invented languages. Attendees are encouraged to prepare, bring, and deliver a paper on any aspect of Tolkien's languages.

See also

 Elfcon

References

Primary
This list identifies each item's location in Tolkien's writings.

Secondary

Sources

External links
 The Elvish Linguistic Fellowship: publishes the journals Parma Eldalamberon, Tengwestië, and Vinyar Tengwar
 The Elvish Linguistic Fellowship's Tolkienian Linguistics FAQ
 The Elvish Linguistic Fellowship's Resources for Tolkienian Linguistics
 The Tolkien language mailing list

Tolkien